In mathematics, an additive set function is a function mapping sets to numbers, with the property that its value on a union of two disjoint sets equals the sum of its values on these sets, namely,  If this additivity property holds for any two sets, then it also holds for any finite number of sets, namely, the function value on the union of k disjoint sets (where k is a finite number) equals the sum of its values on the sets. Therefore, an additive set function is also called a finitely-additive set function (the terms are equivalent). However, a finitely-additive set function might not have the additivity property for a union of an infinite number of sets. A σ-additive set function is a function that has the additivity property even for countably infinite many sets, that is, 

Additivity and sigma-additivity are particularly important properties of measures. They are abstractions of how intuitive properties of size (length, area, volume) of a set sum when considering multiple objects. Additivity is a weaker condition than σ-additivity; that is, σ-additivity implies additivity.

The term modular set function is equivalent to additive set function; see modularity below.

Additive (or finitely additive) set functions

One can prove by mathematical induction that an additive function satisfies

for any  disjoint sets in

σ-additive set functions

Suppose that  is a σ-algebra. If for every sequence  of pairwise disjoint sets in  

Every -additive function is additive but not vice versa, as shown below.

τ-additive set functions

Suppose that in addition to a sigma algebra  we have a topology  If for every directed family of measurable open sets 

we say that  is -additive. In particular, if  is inner regular (with respect to compact sets) then it is τ-additive.

Properties

Useful properties of an additive set function  include the following.

Value of empty set

Either  or  assigns  to all sets in its domain, or  assigns  to all sets in its domain. Proof: additivity implies that for every set   If  then this equality can be satisfied only by plus or minus infinity.

Monotonicity

Similarly, If  is non-positive and  then

Modularity

 
The above property is called  and the argument below proves that modularity is equivalent to additivity.

Additivity implies that both sides of the equality equal 

However, the related properties of submodularity and subadditivity are not equivalent to each other.

Note that modularity has a different and unrelated meaning in the context of complex functions; see modular form.

Set difference

Examples

An example of a -additive function is the function  defined over the power set of the real numbers, such that 

If  is a sequence of disjoint sets of real numbers, then either none of the sets contains 0, or precisely one of them does. In either case, the equality 

holds.

See measure and signed measure for more examples of -additive functions.

An additive function which is not σ-additive

An example of an additive function which is not σ-additive is obtained by considering , defined over the Lebesgue sets of the real numbers  by the formula

where  denotes the Lebesgue measure and  the Banach limit. It satisfies  and if  then 

One can check that this function is additive by using the linearity of the limit. That this function is not σ-additive follows by considering the sequence of disjoint sets

for  The union of these sets is the positive reals, and  applied to the union is then one, while  applied to any of the individual sets is zero, so the sum of is also zero, which proves the counterexample.

Generalizations

One may define additive functions with values in any additive monoid (for example any group or more commonly a vector space). For sigma-additivity, one needs in addition that the concept of limit of a sequence be defined on that set. For example, spectral measures are sigma-additive functions with values in a Banach algebra. Another example, also from quantum mechanics, is the positive operator-valued measure.

See also

 
 
 
 
 
 
 
 
 ba space – The set of bounded charges on a given sigma-algebra

References

Measure theory
Additive functions